Dashon Hugh Goldson (born September 18, 1984) is a former American football safety in the National Football League (NFL). He played college football at the University of Washington, and was drafted by the San Francisco 49ers in the fourth round of the 2007 NFL Draft. He also played for the Tampa Bay Buccaneers, Washington Redskins, and Atlanta Falcons.

Early life
Goldson was born in Carson, California.  He started playing football with the Tri-City Falcons which is a Pop Warner team in Harbor City, California.  He played high school football at Narbonne High School in Harbor City, CA where as a senior he totaled 130 tackles and six interceptions, with two returned for touchdowns.

College career
Goldson had a short stint at Coffeyville community college before enrolling at the University of Washington, where he played for the Washington Huskies football team from 2003 to 2006.  He played in 43 games and recorded a total of 293 tackles, six interceptions, two forced fumbles and one sack. He graduated from the University of Washington in June 2006 with a degree in American Ethnic Studies.

Professional career

San Francisco 49ers

Goldson was selected by the San Francisco 49ers in the fourth round (126th overall) in the 2007 NFL Draft. In his rookie season, he played in ten games, recording 15 tackles as a backup to then-starting safety Mark Roman. In his second year with the 49ers, Goldson recorded 21 tackles as a backup.

2009 season
In 2009, the 49ers front office announced that Goldson would be the starter for free safety going into next season, while giving current starter Mark Roman permission to seek a trade. Although at the time this move was highly questioned, Goldson quickly proved doubters wrong.

Goldson made his NFL debut as a starter against the divisional rival Arizona Cardinals on September 13, where the 49ers were victorious on the season opener, winning 20–16 against the reigning NFC conference champions. In Week 2, Goldson recorded his first career interception by diving under a pass that was tipped by Nate Burleson. The 2009 season would prove to be a productive season, where Goldson led all San Francisco defenders in interceptions with four, and he also forced three fumbles. Goldson finished his first year as an NFL starter with 94 tackles, two sacks, six pass defenses and four interceptions. This was the beginning of Goldson's arrival in the league.

2010 season

Goldson struggled during much of the 2010 season, missing tackles and not forcing turnovers like he did in 2009, finishing with 59 tackles and one interception. Although the San Francisco 49ers team as a whole struggled this year, they showed strides leading up to the 2011 campaign.

2011 season
Prior to the 2011 season, Goldson was an unrestricted free agent and visited with the New England Patriots. He ultimately decided to sign a one-year contract and re-sign with the 49ers. He was named to his first career Pro Bowl, coming in second in the NFC in voting behind Earl Thomas. He had a career-high 6 interceptions and 9 pass deflections during the regular season and is now known to be one of the hardest hitting safeties in the NFL. In the playoffs, he intercepted a Drew Brees pass and returned it near the goal line which resulted in an Alex Smith touchdown pass to Michael Crabtree to give the 49ers a first-quarter 14–0 lead.

2012 season
On October 26, 2012, Goldson was fined $7,875 for taunting the Seattle Seahawks in Week 7. On December 20, 2012, he was fined $77,500 for uniform violations and a helmet-to-helmet collision with Patriots tight end Aaron Hernandez.

In the 2012 season, Goldson and the 49ers appeared in Super Bowl XLVII. In the game, he had nine combined tackles as the 49ers fell to the Baltimore Ravens by a score of 31–34.

He was named to the Pro Bowl and was named to the All-Pro team for the first time in his career.

Tampa Bay Buccaneers

2013 season
On March 13, 2013, Goldson signed a five-year, $41.25 million contract, including $22 million guaranteed with the Tampa Bay Buccaneers. He joins newly arrived cornerback Darrelle Revis and 43rd overall draft pick Johnthan Banks. On September 16, 2013, Goldson was suspended for one game for his helmet-to-helmet hit on New Orleans Saints running back Darren Sproles the previous day. Upon appeal, however, the suspension was overturned and Goldson's penalty for the hit reduced to a $100,000 fine.

2014 season
In 2014, Goldson recorded 81 combined tackles, of which 63 were solo.

Washington Redskins

2015 season
On April 3, 2015, Goldson was traded to the Washington Redskins, along with a seventh round pick, for a sixth round pick in the 2016 NFL Draft. At the start of the 2015 season, he was voted as the team's defensive captain.

Goldson was released on March 7, 2016 after just one season with the team.

Atlanta Falcons

2016 season
On August 28, 2016, Goldson was signed by the Atlanta Falcons to fill a backup role due to safety Keanu Neal injuring his knee. In four games, Goldson made one tackle, coming in a 24–26 loss to  the Seattle Seahawks in Week 6. On October 19, 2016, he was released by the Falcons. On December 20, 2016, he was re-signed by the Falcons. Goldson was inactive for the Falcons' 28–34 overtime loss to the New England Patriots in the Super Bowl.

NFL statistics

References

External links

Washington Redskins bio
Tampa Bay Buccaneers bio 
San Francisco 49ers bio

1984 births
Living people
People from Carson, California
African-American players of American football
American football safeties
National Conference Pro Bowl players
Coffeyville Red Ravens football players
Washington Huskies football players
San Francisco 49ers players
Sportspeople from Los Angeles County, California
Tampa Bay Buccaneers players
Washington Redskins players
Atlanta Falcons players
Players of American football from California
21st-century African-American sportspeople
20th-century African-American people